"Get Down Saturday Night" is a song by American artist Oliver Cheatham, released in 1983 as the first single from his second album Saturday Night. That spring, the song reached number 37 on the US R&B chart., as well as reaching number 38 on the UK Singles Chart. The song was featured in the soundtrack for the video game Grand Theft Auto: Vice City as well as in the 2014 film Ex Machina.

Track listing

1983 releases  
12" vinyl
 US: MCA / L33-1103 

12" vinyl
 UK: MCA / MCAT-828

Other releases
 1988 – "Get Down Saturday Night (You Can Do It)"
 1989 – "Get Down Saturday Night (Get Down in the 90's)" Ger # 23
 1998 – "Get Down Saturday Night '98"
 1999 – "Get Down Saturday Night '99"
 2002 – "Get Down Samedi Soir" (DJ Abdel feat. Rohff & Oliver Cheatham)
 2003 – "Get Down Saturday Night (Stand for Love)"
 2005 – "Get Down Saturday Night" (Unreleased Promo Mix) (Edit by Thomas Bangalter)
 2007 – "Get Down Saturday Night" (Special extended version)

Chart positions

Use in sampling

The song has been sampled for other songs, particularly in electronic dance music.

 Barrio Debajo - "Gotta Let Yourself Go" (1993)
 Smokin Beats - "Make Love Until the Morning Come" (1995)
 DJ Kom - "Git Down Saturday" (1997)
 Bon Garçon - "If You Need a Man" (1998)
 Ideal featuring Li'l Mo & RL - "Whatever" (1999)
 DJ Flex featuring Ken Norris - "Good Feelin'" (2000)
 Master Freakz - "Make Luv (Let Yourself Go)" (2000)

 Room 5 featuring Oliver Cheatham - "Make Luv" (2003)
 Michael Gray - "The Weekend" (2004)
 Rytmus - "Kures Funk" (2006)
 The Supremes - "You Keep Me Hangin' On" (Almighty Funky Mix)
 POLICEMAN - "Poliman Monogatari" (2011)
 The Wonderful Sound of Induce - "Get Down Saturday Night" (2012)
 Lino Di Meglio - "I Can't Live Without" (2013)
 DJ Prodígio featuring Raphael Prince of Soul cover house remix version Deep House (2018)
 Get Down Saturday Night (DJOKO Edit)

References

1983 songs
1983 singles
Oliver Cheatham songs
Ariola Records singles
MCA Records singles